The 1965 All-Eastern football team consists of American football players chosen by various selectors as the best players at each position among the Eastern colleges and universities during the 1965 NCAA University Division football season.

Offense

Quarterback
 Ken Lucas, Pittsburgh (AP-1)

Halfbacks
 Floyd Little, Syracuse (AP-1)
 Ron Landeck, (AP-1)

Fullback
 Dave McNaughton, Penn State (AP-1)

Ends
 Tom Mitchell, Bucknell (AP-1)
 Milt Morin, UMass (AP-1)

Tackles
 Joe Bellas, Penn State (AP-1)
 Mike Addesa, Holy Cross (AP-1)

Guards
 Tony Yezer, Dartmouth (AP-1)
 John Leone, Boston College (AP-1)

Center
 Pat Killorin, Syracuse (AP-1)

Placekicker
 Charlie Gogolak, Princeton (AP-1)

Defense

Ends
 Sam Champi, Army (AP-1)
 Ed Long, Dartmouth (AP-1)

Tackles
 Paul Savidge, Princeton (AP-1)
 Phil Ratner, Cornell (AP-1)

Middle guard
 Vince Casillo, Army (AP-1)

Linebackers
 Townsend Clarke, Army (AP-1)
 Stas Maliszewski, Princeton (AP-1)
 Ray Ilg, Colgate (AP-1)

Backs   
 Charley Brown, Syracuse (AP-1)
 Dave Poe, Harvard (AP-1)
 Dick Gingrich, Penn State (AP-1)

Key
 AP = Associated Press
 UPI = United Press International

See also
 1965 College Football All-America Team

References

All-Eastern
All-Eastern college football teams